Viva voce is a Latin phrase literally meaning "with living voice" but most often translated as "by word of mouth."

It may refer to:
Word of mouth
A voice vote in a deliberative assembly
An oral exam
Thesis defence, in academia
Spoken evidence in law 
Viva Voce (band), an American indie rock band